Howard Green Jr. (born January 12, 1979) is a former American football nose tackle who played professionally in the National Football League (NFL). He was drafted by the Houston Texans in the sixth round of the 2002 NFL draft. He played college football at Louisiana State University for the LSU Tigers football team.

Green has also played for the Baltimore Ravens, New Orleans Saints, Miami Dolphins, Minnesota Vikings, Seattle Seahawks, Washington Redskins,  New York Jets, and the Green Bay Packers with whom he won Super Bowl XLV against the Pittsburgh Steelers.

Professional career

Houston Texans
Green was drafted by the Houston Texans in the sixth round of the 2002 NFL Draft.

Baltimore Ravens
Green signed with the Baltimore Ravens. He played just one game and without recording a single stat.

New Orleans Saints
Green signed with the New Orleans Saints. He played with the team for 2 seasons, playing in 18 games total. Green started in 12 games with the Saints, all in 2004.

Seattle Seahawks
In 2007 Green signed with the Seattle Seahawks. He played 18 games and recorded 28 tackles and one sack during his tenure.

New York Jets
He signed with the New York Jets for the 2009 season.

Washington Redskins
Green was signed to a one-year deal by the Washington Redskins on April 19, 2010. It was expected that he would compete for the starting job at nose tackle however, Green was released from the Redskins on September 4, 2010.

New York Jets (second stint)
On September 15, 2010, following a season-ending injury to Kris Jenkins, the New York Jets re-signed Green to back up new starter Sione Pouha. Green was waived by the team on October 26, 2010.

Green Bay Packers
Green was claimed off waivers by the Green Bay Packers on October 27, 2010. Green was signed in an effort to boost the Packers' injury-depleted roster. He was an assistant specialist with fellow nose tackle B. J. Raji in the 3–4 defense. In Super Bowl XLV against the Pittsburgh Steelers, Green was able to hit quarterback Ben Roethlisberger's arm forcing an interception that was returned for a touchdown. The Packers eventually won the game 31–25.

Personal life
Green is the cousin of former NFL defensive end Jarvis Green and former NFL wide receiver Skyler Green.

References

External links
 Green Bay Packers bio
 Seattle Seahawks bio

1979 births
Living people
People from Donaldsonville, Louisiana
Players of American football from Louisiana
American football defensive tackles
Southwest Mississippi Bears football players
LSU Tigers football players
Houston Texans players
Baltimore Ravens players
New Orleans Saints players
Miami Dolphins players
Minnesota Vikings players
Seattle Seahawks players
New York Jets players
Washington Redskins players
Green Bay Packers players